Ernest Ramsden (1882–1951) was an English professional football left back who played in the Football League for Grimsby Town.

Career statistics

References

1882 births
1951 deaths
English footballers
Brentford F.C. players
English Football League players
Association football fullbacks
Denaby United F.C. players
Southern Football League players
Grimsby Town F.C. players
Mexborough Athletic F.C. players
Footballers from Sheffield
Midland Football League players